Brownlow North (17 July 1741 – 12 July 1820) was a bishop of the Church of England.

Early life, family and education

Brownlow was born on 17 July 1741 in Chelsea, Middlesex, Great Britain, the only son of Francis North, 1st Earl of Guilford and his second wife Elizabeth (then styled as the dowager Viscountess Lewisham as the widow of her first husband George Legge, Viscount Lewisham), only child and sole heir of Arthur Kaye, 3rd Baronet. His half-siblings through their mother included Anne Brudenell (who married James Brudenell, 5th Earl of Cardigan) and William Legge, 2nd Earl of Dartmouth; his half-siblings through their father included Frederick North, Lord North and his only full siblings was Louisa Peyto-Verney (who married John Peyto-Verney, 14th Baron Willoughby de Broke).

He was educated at Eton College (1752–1759) and Trinity College, Oxford (where he matriculated on 10 January 1760 as a fellow-commoner), graduating as a Bachelor of Arts in 1762. He became a Fellow of All Souls College, Oxford in 1763, gaining his Master of Arts (Oxon) on 4 July 1766 and Doctor of Civil Law in 1770.

Church career

North was ordained a deacon at Christ Church by John Hume, Bishop of Oxford, on 27 October 1765 and priest at Grosvenor Chapel, Westminster by Frederick Cornwallis, Bishop of Lichfield and Coventry on 12 April 1767. Supremely well-connected — his father was an influential courtier and his half-brother Frederick was to become Prime Minister of Great Britain — North enjoyed substantial, rapid and early career advances. His brother-in-law Willoughby de Broke presented him to the rectory of Lighthorne, then the crown presented him to the 4th prebend at Christ Church on 28 April 1768.

He remained a canon of Oxford until he was installed as Dean of Canterbury on 6 October 1770; while there he obtained the lucrative livings of Lydd and Bexley, both of which he retained while at Lichfield. North left Canterbury for Lichfield in 1771, when his half-brother the Prime Minister's recommendation saw him elected Bishop of Lichfield and Coventry. His election to that see having been confirmed on 26 August 1771, he was consecrated a bishop by Frederick Cornwallis, Archbishop of Canterbury (with Richard Terrick, Bishop of London; Zachary Pearce, Bishop of Rochester; and William Markham Bishop of Chester) on 8 September 1771 at Lambeth Palace chapel

North was Bishop of Lichfield for three years before his election as Bishop of Worcester was confirmed on 27 December 1774; he then remained in Worcester for six and a half years until his election to the See of Winchester was confirmed on 5 June 1781. Throughout the period of his appointments to these two Sees his half-brother remained Prime Minister.

North was enthroned (by proxy) at Winchester Cathedral on 25 June 1781 and continued as Bishop of Winchester until his death, following a long illness, at Winchester House, Chelsea on 12 July 1820. He was then buried at his cathedral on 21 August 1820.

Marriage and family

On 17 January 1771, North married Henrietta Maria Bannister, who died on 17 November 1796. His eldest son Francis North, 6th Earl of Guilford and his youngest Charles Augustus North both became Anglican priests; of his four daughters, one (Henrietta) married a priest and another (Elizabeth) married Thomas de Grey, 4th Baron Walsingham. The 19th century evangelist, also named Brownlow North was his grandson (Charles' son.)

Styles and titles
1741–1765: The Honourable Brownlow North
1765–1768: The Reverend and Honourable Brownlow North
1768–1770: The Reverend and Honourable Canon Brownlow North
1770-1771: The Very Reverend and Honourable Brownlow North
1771–1820: The Right Reverend and Honourable Brownlow North

References

Sources

External links

1741 births
1820 deaths
Bishops of Lichfield
Bishops of Winchester
Bishops of Worcester
Deans of Canterbury
People educated at Eton College
Alumni of Trinity College, Oxford
Fellows of All Souls College, Oxford
Younger sons of earls
18th-century Church of England bishops